Leontopodium fauriei is a species of plant in the family Asteraceae. It is native to Japan and considered as a rare species by the IUCN since 1998.

References

fauriei